Böyük Mərcanlı (also, Boyuk Marjanly) is a village in the Jabrayil District of Azerbaijan. It is currently uninhabited.

Following the First Nagorno-Karabakh War, the village came under the effective control of the self-declared Republic of Artsakh and was administered as part of Hadrut Province. On 27 September 2020 the Azerbaijani Armed Forces regained control of the village during the 2020 Nagorno-Karabakh conflict.

Notable natives 
 
 Kazim Mammadov — National Hero of Azerbaijan.

References 

Populated places in Jabrayil District